María Soledad Saieh Guzmán (29 August 1972 – 29 August 2017) was a Chilean businesswoman, film producer, and cultural manager.

Biography
The daughter of businessman Álvaro Saieh and architect Anita Guzmán, Soledad Saieh was the second of five siblings. She studied  at the Pontifical Catholic University of Chile and earned a Master of Business Administration from the Massachusetts Institute of Technology. In 2005 she completed postgraduate studies in arts and philanthropy at the Hayman Center for Philanthropy and Fundraising at New York University.

In 2002 she co-founded the CorpArtes Foundation, devoting herself fully to cultural management and serving as its executive director for seven years. She spearheaded the creation of the Santiago International Film Festival (where she acted as a patron for debuting directors such as filmmaker Pablo Larraín, whom she supported to finance and disseminate his film Fuga) and the Chile Arte Contemporáneo international art fair (Ch.ACO), which launched in 2009 in Santiago, along with gallery owners Irene Abujatum, Elodie Fulton, and Florencia Loewenthal. She was also a counselor at the Community Women's Institution, director of the ICARE Finance and Business Circle, and vice president and founder of the Chilean chapter of the National Museum of Women in the Arts.

Soledad Saieh died on 29 August 2017, her 45th birthday, due to acute pulmonary edema that caused an infarction. She is buried in Santiago's Parque del Recuerdo.

References

1972 births
2017 deaths
Chilean company founders
Chilean film producers
Chilean philanthropists
Chilean women in business
MIT Sloan School of Management alumni
New York University alumni
Pontifical Catholic University of Chile alumni
Chilean women film producers
20th-century philanthropists
Respiratory disease deaths in Chile
Deaths from pulmonary edema
Chilean people of Palestinian descent
Chilean people of Colombian descent
Chilean people of Lebanese descent
20th-century women philanthropists